The PZL M-24 Dromader Super ( Super Dromedary) is a single engine agricultural aircraft, developed in the 1980s by the WSK-Mielec (later PZL-Mielec) from the PZL-Mielec M-18 Dromader. It did not progress beyond the  prototyping stage.

Development
The plane was developed as a bigger and more capable variant of the successful agricultural plane PZL-Mielec M-18 Dromader. Some components of the M-18 were used it its construction, but it is generally bigger and stronger, with a more powerful engine. The wings were fitted with a new central section of a larger span.

The first prototype of the M-24 flew on July 20, 1987, and was powered with a  Shvetsov ASh-62IR radial engine. The second prototype, designated M-24B, was powered by the Polish-designed  PZL-Kalisz K-9AA radial engine and first flew in 1988. The third prototype, M-24T, was powered by the Pratt & Whitney PT6A-45AG turboprop engine. Four prototypes were built, but the type did not enter production.

The experience with the M-24 was utilised in creating the M-18B variant of the M-18, powered with the PZL K-9 engine, first flown in 1993.

Design
The aircraft is a metal low-wing cantilever monoplane, conventional in layout. It has a monocoque fuselage, covered with duralumin. The wings are composed of three parts, fitted with flaps and slats. There is a two-seat cabin (pilot and optional passenger or mechanic, in tandem), placed high. The single radial engine has a four blade propeller. Behind the engine is an internal  tank for chemicals or water. A fuel tank holds .

The plane has exchangeable sets of equipment for spraying, cropdusting or fire extinguishing. It has conventional fixed landing gear with a tail wheel.

Specifications (M-24B)

See also

References

Further reading
Andrzej Glass: Samoloty'90, NOT-SIGMA, Warsaw 1990 (Polish language)

External links

M-24 SP-PFB photos
 PZL M21 Dromader Mini

M24
1980s Polish agricultural aircraft
Single-engined tractor aircraft
Low-wing aircraft
Aircraft first flown in 1987